The 1938 New Zealand tour rugby to Australia was the 16th tour by the New Zealand national rugby union team to Australia.

It followed a 1934 tour of Australia by the All Blacks, and the 1936 Australia rugby union tour of New Zealand. New Zealand won all three test matches and retained the Bledisloe Cup.

The tour 
Scores and results list New Zealand's points tally first.

External links 
 New Zealand in Australia 1938 from rugbymuseum.co.nz

New Zealand
New Zealand tour
Australia tour
New Zealand national rugby union team tours of Australia